John Gonzales may refer to:

John Gonzales (Northern Mariana Islands politician), Northern Mariana Islander politician, activist and talk show host
John Gonzales (Tewa politician), Tewa politician and potter